The Crockett Times is a weekly community newspaper serving Crockett County, Tennessee.

The paper was first published as The Crockett County Sentinel in 1873. In 1933, Leslie Sims began publishing The Crockett Times and merged the paper with the Sentinel (of Bells) and The Tri-County News (of Friendship).  Published in Alamo, it is the oldest continually operated business in Crockett County.

The journalistic focus of the paper is on the people, families, and events in the county's communities.

Sources
History & Genealogy - Newspapers at TSLA
Rootsweb
Congressman John Tanner - 8th district media

Publications established in 1873